Mt. Sidney School is a historic public school building located at Mount Sidney, Augusta County, Virginia. the original portion was built in 1912, and is the front gable-roofed, two-story block with an I-house plan consisting of two rooms and a central
hallway on each floor.  It features a central cross gable, one-story, three-bay porch. A four-room brick addition was built in 1921 and a gymnasium added in 1935.  The school closed in 1967, and was subsequently remodeled into apartments.

It was listed on the National Register of Historic Places in 1985.

References

School buildings on the National Register of Historic Places in Virginia
School buildings completed in 1912
Schools in Augusta County, Virginia
National Register of Historic Places in Augusta County, Virginia
1912 establishments in Virginia